Poecilium is a genus of long-horned beetles in the family Cerambycidae. There are at least 20 described species in Poecilium.

Species
These 22 species belong to the genus Poecilium:

 Poecilium abietinum (Plavilstshikov & Lurie, 1960) c g
 Poecilium ahenum Holzschuh, 2007 c g
 Poecilium albicinctum (Bates, 1873) c g
 Poecilium alni (Linné, 1767) c g
 Poecilium antonini Rapuzzi, Sama & Tichy, 2011 c g
 Poecilium ermolenkoi (Tsherepanov, 1980) c g
 Poecilium eximium Holzschuh, 1995 c g
 Poecilium fasciatum (Villers, 1789) c g
 Poecilium glabratum (Charpentier, 1825) c g
 Poecilium gudenzii Sama, 1987 c g
 Poecilium hauseri (Pic, 1907) c g
 Poecilium kasnaki Sama, 2011 c g
 Poecilium latefasciatus (Yang, 2014) c g
 Poecilium lividum (Rossi, 1794) c g b
 Poecilium maaki (Kraatz, 1879) c g
 Poecilium mediofasciatum (Pic, 1933) c g
 Poecilium mizunumai (Hayashi, 1974) c g
 Poecilium puncticolle (Mulsant, 1862) c g
 Poecilium pusillus (Fabricius, 1787) c g
 Poecilium quadrimaculatum (Gressitt, 1935) c g
 Poecilium savioi (Pic, 1935) c g
 Poecilium wrzecionkoi Rapuzzi & Sama, 2010 c g

Data sources: i = ITIS, c = Catalogue of Life, g = GBIF, b = Bugguide.net

References

Further reading

External links

 

Callidiini